The Town of Ignacio (Ute language: Piinuu) is a Statutory Town in La Plata County, Colorado, United States.  The population was 697 at the 2010 United States Census. It is the headquarters of the Southern Ute Indian Reservation.

Geography
Ignacio is located at  (37.116773, -107.634864).

Demographics

At the 2000 census there were 669 people, 262 households, and 175 families in the town. The racial makeup of the town was 51.27% White, 0.75% African American, 21.97% Native American, 0.30% Asian, 18.39% from other races, and 7.32% from two or more races. Hispanic or Latino of any race were 48.58%.

Of the 262 households 33.6% had children under the age of 18 living with them, 45.4% were married couples living together, 14.1% had a female householder with no husband present, and 33.2% were non-families. 27.9% of households were one person and 11.1% were one person aged 65 or older.  The average household size was 2.55 and the average family size was 3.12.

The age distribution was 30.5% under the age of 18, 7.5% from 18 to 24, 29.9% from 25 to 44, 20.5% from 45 to 64, and 11.7% 65 or older.  The median age was 36 years. For every 100 females, there were 91.7 males.  For every 100 females age 18 and over, there were 87.5 males.

The median household income was $27,917 and the median family income  was $39,583. Males had a median income of $27,333 versus $20,125 for females. The per capita income for the town was $14,803.  About 16.8% of families and 19.0% of the population were below the poverty line, including 28.1% of those under age 18 and 7.4% of those age 65 or over.

See also

Ben Nighthorse Campbell
Old Spanish National Historic Trail

References

External links
Town of Ignacio Website
CDOT map of the Town of Ignacio
Community Portal
Ignacio Community Library Website

Towns in Colorado
Towns in La Plata County, Colorado
Seats of government of American Indian reservations